Romain Schneider (born 15 April 1962 in Wiltz) is a Luxembourgian politician for the Luxembourg Socialist Workers' Party (LSAP).  He is a member of the national legislature, the Chamber of Deputies, representing the Nord constituency since the 2004 election.

He has been the mayor of the city of Wiltz from 1 January 2000 until the autumn of 2009 when he joined the government.  Prior to that, he had been a councillor in Wiltz (1994–1999).

Schneider is the former President of the football club FC Wiltz 71.  He has been the Secretary-General of the LSAP since 25 October 2004, having first joined the party in 1981.

Footnotes

External links
  Chamber of Deputies official biography

Mayors of places in Luxembourg
Members of the Chamber of Deputies (Luxembourg)
Members of the Chamber of Deputies (Luxembourg) from Nord
Councillors in Wiltz
Luxembourg Socialist Workers' Party politicians
1962 births
Living people
People from Wiltz
Ministers for Agriculture of Luxembourg